Pharmacolite is an uncommon calcium arsenate mineral with formula CaHAsO4·2(H2O). It occurs as soft, white clusters of fibrous crystals and encrustations which crystallize in the monoclinic system. It is the arsenate analogue of the sulfate gypsum and the phosphate brushite.

Discovery and occurrence
Pharmacolite was first described in 1800 for an occurrence in the Sophia Mine in the Böckelsbach Valley of Wittichen, Schenkenzell, Black Forest, Baden-Württemberg, Germany. The name is from the Greek φάρμακον ("pharmakon"), alluding to its poisonous arsenic content.

It forms by secondary (oxidizing) processes from primary arsenic minerals. It is associated with picropharmacolite, hornesite, haidingerite and rosslerite.

References

Arsenate minerals
Monoclinic minerals
Minerals in space group 9